Sonja Čevnik (born 12 December 1990) is a Slovenian footballer who plays as a goalkeeper and has appeared for the Slovenia women's national team.

Career
Čevnik has been capped for the Slovenia national team, appearing for the team during the 2019 FIFA Women's World Cup qualifying cycle.

References

External links
 
 
 

1990 births
Living people
Slovenian women's footballers
Slovenia women's international footballers
Women's association football goalkeepers